Nuremberg is a city in Germany.

Nürnberg or Nuremberg may refer to:

Places
 Nuremberg Castle (Die Nürnberger Burg)
 Free Imperial City of Nuremberg (1306–1801), a State of the Holy Roman Empire
 Nuremberg, Pennsylvania, United States

Law
 Nuremberg Code
 Nuremberg Defense
 Nuremberg principles
 Nuremberg trials

Nazism
 Nuremberg Laws (Die Nürnberger Gesetze)
 Nuremberg Rally (Der Reichsparteitag)

Films
 Judgment at Nuremberg, a 1961 movie directed by Stanley Kramer and starring Burt Lancaster and Spencer Tracy
 Nuremberg Trials (film), a 1947 Soviet documentary film on the Nuremberg Trials
 Nuremberg (film), a 2000 made-for-TV movie depicting the Nuremberg Trials starring Alec Baldwin

Ships
 SMS Nürnberg (1906)
 SMS Nürnberg (1916)
 German cruiser Nürnberg, German World War II ship

Others
 1. FC Nürnberg, a Bundesliga football (soccer) club
 Nuremberg Chronicle, one of the best documented early printed books
 Nuremberg Files, a website that displayed information about doctors who performed abortions in the United States
 Nuremberg U-Bahn (U-Bahn Nürnberg), a metro run by VAG Nürnberg
 Herbert Nürnberg (1914–1995), German boxer
 M. J. Nurenberger (1911–2001), Jewish journalist, author and publisher

See also 
 Nirenberg, a surname
 Nürnberger (disambiguation)